Leadbetter may refer to:

People
Daniel Parkhurst Leadbetter (1797–1870), a state senator in Ohio during the 1840s.
Danville Leadbetter (1811–1866), a career United States Army officer and Confederate general during the American Civil War. 
David "Dave" Leadbetter (1934–2006), a Scottish political figure.
David Leadbetter (born 1952), a leading golf instructor, originally from England and residing in the United States. 
Frederick Leadbetter (1875–1948), an American financier and lumber and paper milling executive.
James Hunter "Jimmy" Leadbetter (1928–2006), a Scottish footballer (soccer player). 	
Phil Leadbetter (1962–2021), a leading player of the resonator guitar.
Stan Leadbetter (1937–2013), English cricketer
Stiff Leadbetter (c. 1705 – 1766)  British architect and builder

Places
Leadbetter Beach (or Ledbetter Beach), a beach in Santa Barbara, California.
Leadbetter Point, a point in Pacific County, Washington.
Leadbetter Point State Park, a state park and protected area in the U.S. state of Washington.

Entertainment
Jerry Leadbetter, a fictional character on the British television show The Good Life.
Margo Leadbetter, a fictional character on the British television shows The Good Life and Life Beyond the Box: Margo Leadbetter.

See also
Leadbeater, a surname
Leadbitter, a surname
Leadbeater's (disambiguation)
Ledbetter (disambiguation)